Priyanka Bora (born  in Maharashtra, India is an Indian female volleyball player. She was part of the India women's national volleyball team.

She participated at the 2010 Asian Games. On club level she played for Indian Railways in 2010.

References

External links

1985 births
Living people
Indian women's volleyball players
Sportswomen from Maharashtra
Volleyball players at the 2010 Asian Games
21st-century Indian women
21st-century Indian people
Volleyball players from Maharashtra
Asian Games competitors for India